Paul Moon James (1780–1854) was a successful English banker, who worked in partnership with Samuel Galton, Jr. in Steelhouse Lane, Birmingham. Later other members of the Galton family joined the firm, but by the early 1830s Galton & James had been absorbed by another bank. James was also a poet, and lawyer, who also served for a time as magistrate of Worcestershire and later as High Bailiff of Birmingham, England.

James was a private banker for twenty-three years before being hired to manage the Birmingham Banking Company. It was at that time that he became High Bailiff of Birmingham as well. He later became managing director of the Manchester and Salford Joint Stock Bank. One historian noted:

As a poet, James is considered to have made a minor contribution, but it was enough to merit notice:

He was a Quaker. He married Olivia Lloyd, second daughter of Charles Lloyd. He died at Pendleton, Lancashire.

Notes

External links

WorldCat page

1780 births
1854 deaths
People from Birmingham, West Midlands
19th-century British businesspeople